Hrafnhildur Ósk Skúladóttir (born 9 August 1977) is an Icelandic former team handball player and the current head coach of ÍBV women's handball team. She played on the Icelandic national team and participated at the 2011 World Women's Handball Championship in Brazil.

References

1977 births
Living people
Hrafnhildur Skuladottir
Hrafnhildur Skuladottir